Liuhe may refer to the following locations in China:

 Liuhe County (柳河县), Jilin
 Liuhe Pagoda (六和塔), a multi-storied Chinese pagoda in southern Hangzhou


Towns

 Liuhe, Hebei (流河镇), in Qing County
 Liuhe, Taicang (浏河镇), Jiangsu
Written as "六合镇":
 Liuhe, Nehe, Heilongjiang
 Liuhe, Inner Mongolia, in Arun Banner
Written as "刘河镇":
 Liuhe, Xingyang, Henan
 Liuhe, Qichun County, in Qichun County, Huanggang, Hubei
Written as "柳河镇":
 Liuhe, Liuhe County, Jilin
 Liuhe, Mulan County, Heilongjiang
 Liuhe, Ningling County, Henan

Townships
 Liuhe Township, Gansu (柳河乡), in Yumen City
 Liuhe Township, Fangcheng County (柳河乡), Henan
 Liuhe Township, Yongcheng (刘河乡), Henan
Written as "六合乡":
 Liuhe Township, Hunan, in Guiyang County
 Liuhe Township, Jiangyou, Sichuan
 Liuhe Township, Yingjing County, Sichuan
 Liuhe Township, Yingshan County, Sichuan
 Liuhe Yi Ethnic Township (六合彝族乡), Heqing County, Yunnan

Village
 Liuhe, a village in Xinghua Township, Hong'an County, Huangang, Hubei

See also
Liu He (disambiguation)